Khak Shur (also Romanized as Khāk Shūr and Khakshūr) is a village in Deylaman Rural District, Deylaman District, Siahkal County, Gilan Province, Iran. At the 2006 census, its population was 18, in 6 families.

References 

Populated places in Siahkal County